Khancoban is a small town in Snowy Valleys Council, New South Wales, Australia.

Khancoban Post Office opened on 7 November 1876.

Tourism
The town is a popular launching place for tourists exploring the Snowy Mountains area including Kosciuszko National Park.  Khancoban is linked to Jindabyne and Cooma by the Alpine Way, a scenic route that takes travellers past the ski resort of Thredbo.  The closest regional centre is Corryong,  to the west in Victoria.

Economy
Khancoban was constructed to house workers involved in the Snowy Mountains Scheme, Australia's largest engineering project, designed to provide hydro-electric power and water for irrigation to vast areas of the nation. The town is still mainly populated by workers employed by Snowy Hydro Limited working in places such as Murray 1 and Murray 2 Power Stations.

Climate
Khancoban has a typical climate of the South West Slopes, with four distinct seasons. Under the Köppen climate classification scheme, the town has a humid subtropical climate (Cfa) with strong oceanic influence. It is characterised by its inland location and likewise windward position (west of the Snowy Mountains); with the summers having a high diurnal range, and relatively low humidity and rainfall amount—although thunderstorms usually increase humidity in summer somewhat. 

Winters are cool, overcast and very rainy, with occasional snowfalls, and a much narrower diurnal range due to frequent cloud cover. Autumns are mild and dry, with crisp nights. Springs are mild, albeit tepid by November, and damp with a high frequency of thunderstorms.

Khancoban SMHEA (1961–1994)

Khancoban AWS (1996–2020)

Gallery

References

External links

Tumbarumba Shire Council – Official Site

Towns in New South Wales
Snowy Mountains Scheme
Snowy Valleys Council